Our Party (Bosnian, Croatian, and Serbian: Naša stranka/Наша странка, abbreviated NS) is a social-liberal and multi-ethnic political party in Bosnia and Herzegovina, founded in 2008. Its current leader is Edin Forto. The party's founders are the Bosnian directors Danis Tanović and Dino Mustafić. The party aims to break the dominance of nationalist parties in the Bosnian political system. On 4 June 2016, Our Party became a member of the Alliance of Liberals and Democrats for Europe.

Platform
Our Party (Naša Stranka) is a social-liberal party that seeks greater inclusion of citizens in the decision-making process in Bosnia and Herzegovina. They are also pro-EU and pro-NATO. They are multi-ethnic and socially liberal.

Our Party also believes that collective rights should not have priority over individual rights and are against ethnically-based decision-making processes. They believe that the rights of constituent nations of Bosnia and Herzegovina should be clearly formulated and enumerated, and the party's belief is that the Constitutional Court should be the one protecting vital ethnic interests and not the House of Peoples, which according to Our Party should be abolished.

They do not agree with the concept of privatization at all costs, but rather believe that it should be done strategically and that public companies should be kept public if they are financially and economically viable.

Our Party states in their 2015 official party economic programme that they consider the cost of labour in Bosnia and Herzegovina to be too high. One of the party documents was called "Third Way", reflecting the party's strong support of neoliberal ideas, such as support for the free market, free trade, deregulation, privatisation, reduction of taxes for private companies, public-private partnerships, etc.

Our Party believes that small and medium-sized enterprises are essential for Bosnia and Herzegovina's economic development. According to the party's platform, the taxes should be lowered in order to attract domestic and foreign investments.

The party is also for progressive taxation and differentiated VAT rates in order to make basic necessities cheaper.
Our Party is also for the decrease of the enormous administration which according to them would improve Bosnia's economic situation significantly.

The party believes, in contrast to ethnic parties of Bosnia and Herzegovina, that the economy is the main integration mechanism.

History

Foundation, 2008
Our Party was founded on 5 April 2008 on the initiative of a group of citizens and public figures led by directors Danis Tanović and Dino Mustafić. None of them became president of the party, which is in contrast to most other leader-oriented parties that emerged in Bosnia and Herzegovina after the war. Instead, they became vice presidents, together with Maja Marjanović and Boris Divković, while Bojan Bajić was elected the president and Fadil Šero secretary-general. The unifying element for the founders of Our Party was the dissatisfaction with current political practices in Bosnia and Herzegovina.

The first elections Our Party contested were local elections claiming their aim was to build the party infrastructure from below by building local organisations and dealing with real-life issues.

They won 24 seats in different municipal assemblies and their candidate Hajder Ermin became the head of the municipality in Bosanski Petrovac.

Period from 2010 to 2012
After the elections in 2010, and relatively poor results – 2 seats in Sarajevo Canton Assembly and one seat in Federation of Bosnia and Herzegovina House of Peoples, the party chose new leadership with Dennis Gratz becoming the president and Rada Sukara secretary general.

One of the main problems the party had in the period 2008–2010 was its large local infrastructure which was financially unfeasible. After the new leadership took over, the party started massive reconstruction. They’ve decided to pull from municipalities where they didn’t have much support and concentrate on those municipalities where they did have such as Sarajevo municipalities (Stari Grad, Centar, Novo Sarajevo, Novi Grad, Ilidža, Vogošća) as well as Gračanica, Vareš, Zenica, Tuzla and Doboj-Istok.

2014 general elections
The decision to concentrate on municipalities where they did have electoral success in the past proved to be very smart move, and the party had the best results in its history in the 2014 general elections. Naša Stranka doubled the number of votes and increased its seat number by one in the Canton Sarajevo Assembly. They also managed to win one seat in the Federation of Bosnia and Herzegovina House of Representatives (Dennis Gratz) and one two seats in the Federation of Bosnia and Herzegovina House of Peoples (Edin Forto and Predrag Kojović).

After the electoral success in 2014, the party decided to once again expand their local organisations across Bosnia and Herzegovina and now they operate in Banja Luka, Bihać, Bosanska Krupa, Bosanski Petrovac, Breza, Centar Sarajevo, Doboj Istok, Gračanica, Gradačac, Ilidža, Kakanj, Lukavac, Maglaj, Mostar, Novi Grad, Sarajevo, Novo Sarajevo, Sanski Most, Srebrenik, Stari Grad Sarajevo, Tuzla, Vareš, Visoko, Vogošća, Zenica, Živinice

On 16 May 2015, Predrag Kojović was elected the new president of the party.

2016 municipal elections
The Bosnian municipal elections were held on Sunday, 2 October 2016. Our Party had their own candidates for heads of municipalities in Bihać, Bosanska Krupa, Zenica, Visoko, Ilidža, Novo Sarajevo, Novi Grad - Sarajevo, Centar, Stari Grad - Sarajevo, Tuzla, Goražde and Gračanica. Our Party also participated in Sanski Most, Bosanski Petrovac, Vareš, Lukavac, Vogošća and Doboj-Jug where they offered their candidates for municipal councils.

After the elections, Our Party has significantly increased its share of votes in city of Sarajevo, becoming the second largest political party in the capital of BiH. It is the largest left leaning party in the city.

The party will also have municipal representatives in Bosanska Krupa, Zenica, Visoko, Goražde, Gračanica, Bosanski Petrovac, Vareš, Doboj-Istok and municipality of Sanski Most.

2018 general elections
In the 2018 general elections, Our Party had a candidate for the Presidency of Bosnia and Herzegovina for the first time. On 21 April 2018, it was confirmed that its candidate, representing the Croats was Boriša Falatar. At the election, Falatar won only 3.74% of the votes, or 16,036. The Party did win 48,401 and 50,947 votes for the National and Federal House of Representatives respectively.

List of presidents

Elections

Parliamentary elections

Presidency elections

Cantonal elections

References

External links
Official website

Liberal parties in Bosnia and Herzegovina
Pro-European political parties in Bosnia and Herzegovina
Secularism in Bosnia and Herzegovina
Social liberal parties